"Carolina Moon" is a popular song, written by  Joe Burke and Benny Davis. Written in 1924, the song was first recorded in 1928 by American crooner Gene Austin whose version charted for 14 weeks, seven of them at #1.

A version of "Carolina Moon" was recorded by Connie Francis in June 1958: as with her breakthrough hit "Who's Sorry Now?", "Carolina Moon" was recommended to Francis by her father. The B-side of Francis's international hit "Stupid Cupid" "Carolina Moon" became a double A-side hit with "Stupid Cupid"  which began a six-week tenure at #1 on the UK Singles Chart dated September 27, 1958.
Benny Davis would later write several songs for Connie Francis including the 1962 #1 hit "Don't Break the Heart That Loves You" (Joe Burke had died in 1950).

Maureen McGovern recorded "Carolina Moon" for her 1979 self-titled album release with the track serving as the B-side of her Top 20 single "Different Worlds" – this version erroneously credits the song as being of "Traditional" composition.

The song has also been recorded by the Chordettes, Perry Como, Annette Hanshaw, Dean Martin, Jim Reeves, Ben Selvin, Kate Smith, Slim Whitman, and Thelonious Monk in a jazz instrumental version.

The song 
The song contains the memorable chorus:-

Oh, Carolina Moon keep shining.
 
 
shining on the one who waits for me.

Carolina Moon, I'm pining,

pining for the place I long to be.

It describes the feelings of  parted lovers , connected by the knowledge that the same moon shines on them both.

References

1928 songs
Music published by MPL Music Publishing
Songs written by Benny Davis
Songs with music by Joe Burke (composer)